Hugo Bleicher (1899–1982) was a senior non-commissioned officer of Nazi Germany's Abwehr who worked against French Resistance in German-occupied France.

Early life and World War I 
Hugo Ernst Bleicher was born in Tettnang on 9 August 1899. He served as a private soldier in the First World War in the pioneer gas corps and was captured near the Somme. He was held as a Prisoner of War in 165 POW Camp near Abbeville and succeeded in escaping four times, although he was never able to return to the German lines. He is misreported as having been taken prisoner by the British in Belgium as a spy when wearing a British uniform. After the war he became a businessman.

World War II 
Bleicher was recruited into the Abwehr during the Second World War because of his knowledge of French and Spanish; however, he never rose above the rank of Feldwebel (equivalent to Sergeant).

He was ruthless in his pursuit of anyone in France who opposed German domination. He disabled the Franco-Polish "Interallié" network, and captured both Polish Air Force Captain Roman Czerniawski and some of his headquarters staff, one of whom was Mathilde Carré, who had contacts with the Vichy 2nd Bureau. She reportedly became Bleicher's lover, betrayed everyone she knew in the network, and agreed to act as an Abwehr agent. Subsequently, she changed sides again and betrayed her dealings with the Abwehr to MI5, who used her radio link for deception purposes for a period in conjunction with the Poles and the SIS and then imprisoned her when her usefulness had ceased, until the end of the war.

In March 1943, Bleicher arrested André Marsac, a member of the resistance organisation known as Carte. Masquerading, on his own initiative, as a German intelligence colonel attempting to defect to the Allies, he deceived Marsac and his associate Roger Bardet, and persuaded Bardet to work for him as a double agent.

Bardet betrayed SOE agents Peter Churchill and Odette Sansom who were arrested by Bleicher in April 1943. Sansom was subjected to brutal treatment and torture during interrogation before being transferred to a concentration camp, although none of this was carried out by Bleicher himself.

Bardet betrayed the INVENTOR network, leading to the arrests in October/November 1943 of its organiser Sidney Jones, wireless operator Marcel Clech, and courier Vera Leigh, all of whom were executed, and resulting in the collapse of the network.

Bardet also betrayed Henri Frager, another former Carte member who had been commissioned by the SOE as leader of its Donkeyman circuit, whom Bleicher arrested in July 1944, and Frager was subsequently executed.

He was also associated with SOE agent Henri Dericourt (Farrier), who was also a double agent for the Sicherheitsdienst.

Postwar 
Hugo Bleicher, together with two of his French Abwehr agents Jean Rocquefort and Francois Barbier, was arrested in Amsterdam on 15 May 1945 by the Dutch NBS, who interrogated him for two weeks on his activities in the Netherlands before handing him over to the First Canadian Army, who interrogated him for a further period, also on his operations in the Netherlands, before handing him over to the British authorities, who transferred him on 16 June 1945 to the UK for longer term interrogation at Camp 020. He was handed over to the French government on 12 October 1945, and they subsequently placed him on trial and imprisoned him, as they also did with Mathilde Carré.

While imprisoned in Paris he met Bardet and told him he had planned to assassinate him on one occasion as Bardet knew too much against him.

He visited the UK after the war, to testify against Abwehr colleague Robert Alesch during his trial in May 1948 as a double agent. He also visited Peter Churchill in France.

In 1954, he published his memoirs, Colonel Henri's story. Bleicher (sometimes misreported as Bliechert) actively employed the aliases Jean Verbeck and Colonel Henri (often misreported as Colonel Heinrich). He held, but never used, identity papers in the name of Jean Castel. He landed in the UK under the Canadian supplied alias of Charles Davidson, and has been misreported as using the names von Stahlen, Henri Bothereau or Gottschalk. He was decorated by the Abwehr with the War Merit Cross 1st Class for his services.

After the war, he ran a tobacco shop.

The character of Sergeant Gratz in the 1970 LWT television series Manhunt suggests that he is partly inspired by Bleicher.

Bibliography 
 Colonel Henri's story : the war memoirs of Hugo Bleicher former German secret agent. Hugo Ernst Bleicher, Ian Colvin, and Erich Borchers. London : William Kimber, 1954. OCLC Number: 220971979

External links
 Bleicher in Spartacus Educational

References 

1899 births
Abwehr personnel of World War II
German Army personnel of World War I
German military personnel of World War II
People from the Kingdom of Württemberg
1982 deaths
People from Bodenseekreis
Military personnel from Baden-Württemberg